Coolie itch is a cutaneous condition caused by Rhizoglyphus parasiticus, characterized by an intense pruritus. It is found in India on tea plantations and causes sore feet.

Rhizoglyphus parasiticus is a type of mite.

See also 
 Copra itch
 Skin lesion

References 

Parasitic infestations, stings, and bites of the skin